The 1939 Nebraska Cornhuskers football team was an American football team that represented the University of Nebraska in the Big Six Conference during the 1939 college football season. In its third season under head coach Biff Jones, the team compiled a 7–1–1 record (4–1 against conference opponents), finished second in the Big Six, and was ranked No. 18 in the final AP Poll. The Cornhuskers outscored opponents by a total of 115 to 70. The team played its home games at Memorial Stadium in Lincoln, Nebraska.

Before the season
Coach Jones was under some scrutiny upon the start of his third year at the helm of the program, as it wasn't entirely clear if his successful first year in 1937 was a product of his leadership or a remnant of former head coach Dana X. Bible's legacy.  After suffering a 3-5-1 campaign in 1938, the most losses in a single season since 1899, coach Jones needed to get the program back on its feet.

Schedule

Roster

Coaching staff

Game summaries

Indiana

Indiana scored first and held Nebraska off with the narrow 7-0 lead for most of the rest of the game.  Finally, as time was running out, the Cornhuskers pulled up to the Hoosier 1 yard line.  After two subsequent scoring attempts were turned away, Nebraska executed a reverse around the right and scored with less than 90 seconds remaining to play.  Indiana responded valiantly, quickly driving from their own 35 to the Nebraska 10 before a turnover ended their last hope with 35 seconds still on the clock.  Indiana thus remained winless against Nebraska in all four of their attempts.

Minnesota

Nebraska brought old nemesis Minnesota to Lincoln and attacked the Gophers with a powerful running offense, while the Cornhusker defense put up an outstanding effort to keep Minnesota off the scoreboard all day long.  Nebraska threw only a single pass during the contest, and made their lone score using the same play that slipped past Indiana in the previous game.  The rare win was savored by the Cornhuskers, but Nebraska had a long way to go if they ever hoped to even up the series, as the Gophers still held a dominating edge of 15-4-2 over the Cornhuskers.

Iowa State

Nebraska opened the 1939 conference slate with a relatively easy win over Iowa State, running out to a 10-0 lead by the start of the 4th quarter.  The Cyclones did manage a late rally to put up 7 late points, but the Cornhuskers successfully avenged the previous year's upsetting loss to Iowa State and padded the series lead over the Cyclones to 28-5-1.

Baylor

Baylor met Nebraska for the first time in what was presented initially as a marquee matchup of two highly touted lines.  The day belonged to Nebraska all the way, however, as the Cornhuskers pulled up to a 6-0 lead by the half before breaking away with two more touchdowns in the 3rd quarter on their way to blanking the Bears in Lincoln.

Kansas State

See also 1939 Nebraska vs. Kansas State football game
Kansas State found the scoreboard first on an early field goal, but a punt returned for a touchdown turned the tide, and two Wildcat fumbles later on handed additional points to the Cornhuskers, who never looked back.  It was Nebraska's fourth straight win over Kansas State as the series was advanced to 20-2-2 all time.

The game was the second televised college football game of all time, and the first ever televised homecoming game.

Missouri

Missouri handed Nebraska its first and only loss of the season in Columbia, easily holding Nebraska off  by a two-touchdown margin to hold onto the Missouri-Nebraska Bell.  It was the second straight Tiger victory, but Missouri still lagged in the series 8-22-3.

Kansas

The Cornhuskers wasted no time in finding the scoreboard early on, but wasted two scoring attempts soon afterward to lost fumbles.  The game remained fairly evenly matched thereafter, until a late spirited attack by the Jayhawks put a brief minor scare in Nebraska before being warded off.  This was the 14th straight game dropped to the Cornhuskers, and the Jayhawks fell to 9-34-3 against the Cornhuskers in the series.

Pittsburgh

The bitter rivalry with Pittsburgh was continued when the Cornhuskers arrived for the game at Pitt Stadium with hopes to end the long streak of Nebraska futility against the Panthers.  The Cornhuskers battled to a slim 7-6 halftime lead, a margin which would eventually prove enough for the win after both teams each managed a second half touchdown apiece.  Nebraska's six-game losing streak and twelve-game winless streak against Pittsburgh, both all-time program records to date, were snapped at last.  Still, this was only Nebraska's second win against Pittsburgh in all 14 attempts, leaving a long way for the Cornhuskers to go to catch up.

Oklahoma

Oklahoma, a recent source of frustration to Nebraska after defeating the Cornhuskers in the previous year and drawing up a tie the year before that, once again fell to Nebraska as the Cornhuskers wrapped up the conference slate with just one loss overall, to Big 6 champion Missouri.  Though the Sooners scored early, Nebraska promptly answered before the half to take the lead, and no further scores were attained by either team afterwards.  Nebraska improved in the series to 13-3-3.

After the season
Coach Jones redeemed himself in a convincing manner following the disappointing 1938 season.  Although Nebraska did not bring home a conference title this year, the Cornhuskers were able to defeat both bitter rivals Minnesota and Pittsburgh in the same season for the first time ever, and wrapped up the season with a defeat of #14 Oklahoma to move into the rankings themselves in the postseason poll.  Coach Jones saw his overall career record at Nebraska bounce back substantially, to 16-7-4 (.667), while his conference total also improved to 9-4-2 (.667).  The Cornhuskers now owned an overall record of 286-96-31 (.730) and a Big 6 conference record of 96-15-11 (.832).

Awards

References

Nebraska
Nebraska Cornhuskers football seasons
Nebraska Cornhuskers football